Agatha Trunchbull, also known as Miss Trunchbull or Miss Agatha Trunchbull or simply The Trunchbull, the fictional headmistress of Crunchem Hall Primary School (or Elementary School), is the main antagonist in Roald Dahl’s 1988 novel Matilda and its spinoffs: the 1996 film Matilda (played by Pam Ferris), the 2011 musical Matilda (played by Bertie Carvel) and the 2022 film Matilda the Musical (played by Emma Thompson). She is said to look "more like a rather eccentric and bloodthirsty follower of the stag-hounds than the headmistress of a nice school for children".

Miss Trunchbull is depicted as an unwholesome role model, a fierce tyrannical monster who "frightened the life out of pupils and teachers alike", notorious for her cruel and wildly idiosyncratic discipline: trivial misdeeds (including simply wearing pigtails) incurring punishments up to potentially-fatal physical discipline.

Fictional character biography 
Miss Trunchbull's contempt for children is so great that she denies ever having been a child herself aside from one instance in the novel where she claims she was not a child for very long and became a woman very fast. As a young adult, she competed in the 1972 Summer Olympics (in the 1996 film version).

Miss Trunchbull is the aunt of Jennifer Honey. Miss Trunchbull served as Jennifer's childhood guardian after the death of her parents, having already moved into the family home after the death of Matilda’s mother (Miss Trunchbull’s sister). It's strongly implied that Agatha murdered Magnus Honey, Jennifer's father, and made it appear to be suicide. Agatha then became the legal owner of the Honey estate and Jennifer's legal guardian. Jennifer's exposure as a little girl to Agatha's abuse inevitably rendered her soft-spoken and timid. Jennifer admits she became Agatha's slave, doing the chores and housework. Once Jennifer graduated from school and teachers' training college, Agatha seized hold of Jennifer's hard earned salary for the first 10 years of her teaching career (in the 1988 novel, she paid her £1 per week pocket money). 

In support of her school teacher, Matilda uses her telekinetic abilities to drive Agatha from her own house one day by posing as Magnus's spirit and levitating a chalk stick to scrawl a message on the board, warning her to give His daughter her house and money. Terrified and scared, Miss Trunchbull subsequently disappears. Magnus’s will then turns up and the house is passed to her house to Miss Honey, who in the film becomes the new headmistress of Matilda's school. In the novel, the deputy head Mr Trilby (not seen or mentioned in the film) takes over the headship of the school.

It is revealed that Miss Trunchbull is very superstitious and has an intense fear of ghosts, black cats, and the supernatural in general. Her fear is later used as a weakness for Matilda to scare her thus teaching Miss Trunchbull a lesson.

In the film, Miss Trunchbull was a shot putter, hammer, and javelin thrower in the Munich Olympics. In the novel, she performed similar exploits but the exact dates and events are not mentioned. She often throws children and uses a crop to scare children as punishment, which often ends in accidents or injuries. She is brutal to all children and also made a boy (Bruce Bogtrotter) eat a colossal chocolate cake as punishment for apparently eating a piece of her own chocolate cake.

Inspiration
As children, Roald Dahl and his friends played a trick on the local sweet-shop owner—a "mean and loathsome" old woman named Mrs Pratchett—by putting a dead mouse in a gobstopper jar. This would later inspire Dahl to include a scene in Matilda where Matilda's friend Lavender puts a newt into Miss Trunchbull's water jug.

She was also inspired by Faina Melnik, the Olympic gold medalist in the 1972 Summer Olympics.

Portrayals
Miss Trunchbull is portrayed by Pam Ferris in the 1996 film, and by Bertie Carvel in the musical, later replaced by former Two of a Kind and Shrek The Musical star Christopher Sieber. Emma Thompson plays the role in the 2022 film adaptation of the musical. 

Miriam Margolyes confirmed that she auditioned for the role (before Ferris was cast) during a filmed interview with Jo Brand for the UK television special Roald Dahl's Revolting Rule Book which was hosted by Richard E. Grant and aired on September 22, 2007.  This documentary commemorated Dahl's 90th birthday and also celebrated his impact as a children's author in popular culture.

References

Female characters in film
Literary characters introduced in 1988
Fictional bullies
Fictional child abusers
Fictional English people
Fictional female murderers
Fictional principals and headteachers
Fictional track and field athletes
Female literary villains
Female film villains
Matilda (novel)
Roald Dahl characters
Fictional Olympic competitors
Film characters introduced in 1996